The twelfth season of the American fictional drama television series ER first aired on September 22, 2005, and concluded on May 18, 2006. It consists of 22 episodes.

Plot

Kovač and Abby become the main central characters and their relationship slowly starts to get back on track as they deal with her unexpected pregnancy. A new nurse manager causes friction among the staff, following a successful operation Weaver no longer needs her cane, Pratt journeys to Africa where he joins Carter on a relief mission while a face from Sam's past leaves the lives of Abby and Kovač hanging in the balance. In addition to Darfur, geopolitics of the day get a strong spotlight due to the Iraq War.

Cast

Changes
Following Sherry Stringfield's departure in the season premiere, this season becomes the first to not feature any of the original cast members in a regular capacity (Noah Wyle is featured for four episodes in a guest capacity throughout the season).

Main cast
 Goran Visnjic as Dr. Luka Kovač, Attending Physician / Chief of Emergency Medicine 
 Maura Tierney as Dr. Abby Lockhart, Second Year Resident
 Mekhi Phifer as Dr. Greg Pratt, Fourth Year Resident
 Sherry Stringfield as Dr. Susan Lewis, Chief of Emergency Medicine (episode 1)
 Parminder Nagra as Dr. Neela Rasgotra, Second Year Resident
 Linda Cardellini as Nurse Samantha Taggart
 Shane West as Dr. Ray Barnett, Second Year Resident
 Scott Grimes as Dr. Archie Morris, Chief Resident
 Laura Innes as Dr. Kerry Weaver, Chief of Staff

Supporting

Doctors and medical students
 John Leguizamo as Dr. Victor Clemente, Attending Physician
 Amy Aquino as Dr. Janet Coburn, Chief of Obstetrics and Gynecology
 John Aylward as Dr. Donald Anspaugh, Surgical Attending Physician and Hospital Board Member
 Leland Orser as Dr. Lucien Dubenko, Chief of Surgery
 Sara Gilbert as Dr. Jane Figler, ER Intern
 Michael Buchman Silver as Dr. Paul Myers, Psychiatrist
 Maury Sterling as Dr. Nelson, Psychiatrist
 Dahlia Salem as Dr. Jessica Albright, Surgical Chief Resident
Anthony Giangrande as Dr. Jeremy Munson, ER Intern
 Michael Spellman as Dr. Jim Babinski, ER Intern
 Kim Strauss as Dr. Ari, Anesthesiologist
Britain Spellings as Dr. Sackowitz
 Corey Stoll as Dr. Teddy Marsh, Intern
Damali Scott as Dr. Lana Clemons, Intern
 Christopher Grove as Dr. Marty Kline

Nurses
 Kristen Johnston as Nurse Manager Eve Peyton
 Deezer D as Nurse Malik McGrath
 Laura Cerón as Nurse Chuny Marquez
 Yvette Freeman as Nurse Haleh Adams
 Lily Mariye as Nurse Lily Jarvik
 Dinah Lenney as Nurse Shirley
 April Lee Hernandez as Nurse Inez
 Kyle Richards as Nurse Dori Kerns
Nadia Shazana as OR Nurse Jacy
 Cynthia Cervini as Nurse Anna Waldron

Staff, Paramedics and Officers
 Abraham Benrubi as Desk Clerk Jerry Markovic
 Troy Evans as Desk Clerk Frank Martin
 Tara Karsian as Social Worker Liz Dade
 Jordan Calloway as Hospital Volunteer K.J. Thibeaux
 China Shavers as Olivia Evans from Ceasefire
 John Stamos as Paramedic Tony Gates
 Emily Wagner as Paramedic Doris Pickman
 Montae Russell as Paramedic Dwight Zadro
 Lyn. A Henderson as Paramedic Pamela Olbes
 Brian Lester as Paramedic Brian Dumar
 Michelle C. Bonilla as Paramedic Christine Harms
 Demetrius Navarro as Paramedic Morales
 Louie Liberti as Paramedic Bardelli
 Christopher Amitrano as Officer Hollis
 Bobby Nish as Officer Danny Yau
 Eddie B. Smith as Officer Jones
 Mary E. Kennedy as Officer Trudy Lange
 Louis Iacoviello as Officer Rovner

Family
 Dominic Janes as Alex Taggart
 Garret Dillahunt as Steve Curtis
 Danny Glover as Charlie Pratt
 Sam Jones III as Chaz Pratt
 Tina Lifford as Evelyn Pratt
 Cecily Lewis as Jocelyn Pratt
 Ernie Hudson as Colonel James Gallant
 Sheryl Lee Ralph as Gloria Gallant
 Hassan Johnson as Darnell Thibeaux

Guest stars
 Noah Wyle as Dr. John Carter
 Sharif Atkins as Dr. Michael Gallant
 Mary McCormack as Debbie (in Darfur)
 Eamonn Walker as Dr. Steven Dakarai (in Darfur)
 Kat Dennings as Zoe Butler
 Serena Williams as Alice Watson
 Stana Katic as Blaire Collins
 James Woods as Dr. Nate Lennox
 Armand Assante as Richard Elliott

Episodes

References

External links 

War in Darfur
Iraq War in television
2005 American television seasons
2006 American television seasons
ER (TV series) seasons